The Devi Bhagavata Purana, also known as the Srimad Devi Bhagavatam, Srimad Bhagavatam,  Bhagavata Purana or simply Devi Bhagavatam, is one of the eighteen Mahapuranas of Hinduism. Composed in Sanskrit by Veda Vyasa, the text is considered as a major purana for Devi worshippers. It promotes bhakti (devotion) towards Mahadevi, integrating themes from the Shaktadvaitavada tradition (syncretism of Samkhya and Advaita Vedanta. literally, the path of nondualistic Shakti). 

The purana consists of twelve cantos (sections) with 318 chapters. Along with Devi Mahatmya, it is one of the most important works in Shaktism, a tradition within Hinduism that reveres Devi or Shakti (Goddess) as the primordial creator of the universe and the Brahman (ultimate truth and reality). It celebrates the divine feminine as the origin of all existence, the creator, the preserver and the destroyer of everything, as well as the one who empowers spiritual liberation. While all major Puranas of Hinduism mention and revere the Goddess, this text centers around her as the primary divinity. The underlying philosophy of this text is Advaita Vedanta-style monism combined with devotional worship of Shakti (feminine power).It is believed that this was spoken by Vyasa to King Janamejaya, the son of Parikshit.

Nomenclature
The title of the text, Srimad Devi Bhagavata, is composed of two words, which together mean "devotees of the blessed Devi".

 'Srimad' (or 'Srimat', Sanskrit श्रीमत्) means 'radiant', 'holy', 'splendid', or 'glorious', and is an honorific religious title.
'Sri' (or 'Shri' or 'Shree', Sanskrit श्री) means 'Prosperity'. Goddess Lakshmi referred to as 'Sri'. Also Supreme goddess Tripura Sundari called as 'Sri mata'.
 'Devi' (Sanskrit: देवी) is the Sanskrit word for 'goddess'; the masculine form is deva. The terms Devi and Deva are Sanskrit terms found in Vedic literature of 2nd millennium BCE, wherein Devi is feminine and Deva is masculine. Monier Williams translates it as "heavenly, divine, terrestrial things of high excellence, exalted, shining ones".
 Bhagavata' (or 'Bhagavatam' or 'Bhagavat, Sanskrit भागवत) means "devotee of the blessed Devi." In devi Bhagavata purana God or Bhagavan connotation as the supreme goddess. 
 'Purana' (Sanskrit पराण) means 'ancient' or 'old' (or 'old traditional history'). It also means 'complete' and 'completing' in the sense that a Purana 'completes the Vedas'.
'Maha' (Sanskrit महत) means 'great', 'large', or 'vast'.

History

The Srimad Devi Bhagavata Mahapurana has been variously dated. A few scholars suggest an early date, such as Ramachandran who suggested that the text was composed before the 6th-century CE. However, this early date has not found wide support, and most scholars to date it between the 9th and the 14th century. Rajendra Hazra suggests 11th or 12th century, while Lalye states that the text began taking form in the late centuries of the 1st millennium, was expanded over time, and its first complete version existed in the 11th century. Tracy Pintchman dates the text to between 1000 and 1200 CE.

The last ten chapters (31 to 40) of the seventh canto consist of 507 verses, a part which has often circulated as an independent handout just like the Bhagavad Gita of the Mahabharata circulates independently. The handout from Book 7 of this Purana is called Devi Gita. This handout may have been composed with the original text, or it might be a later interpolation, states C Mackenzie Brown. He suggests that this portion of the text was probably composed by the 13th century and may be later but before the 16th century.

The ninth canto of the Srimad Devi Bhagavata Mahapurana contains many verses that reference Mlecchas (barbarians) and Yavanas (foreigners). These words may just refer to hill tribes, but the details contained in the description of Mlecchas within these verses, state some scholars such as Hazra, that the writer of these parts knew about Islam and its spread in India, leading scholars date these parts of the ninth book to 12th to 15th century compared to the older core of the ninth book.

The Devi Bhagavata Mahapurana is not the earliest Indian text that celebrates the divine feminine, the 6th-century Devi Mahatmya embedded in Markandeya Purana asserts the goddess to be supreme, and multiple archaeological evidence in different parts of India such as Mathura and Bengal suggests that the concept of divine feminine was in existence by about the 2nd-century CE. Both Devi Mahatmya and Devi Bhagavata Purana have been very influential texts of the Shakta tradition, asserting the supremacy of the female and making goddess a figure of devotional (bhakti) appeal.

This text – along with all Puranas, all Vedas and the Mahabharata – is attributed to sage Veda Vyasa in the Hindu tradition.

Characters

Avatars of Devi 
This table shows the Notable incarnations of Devi mentioned in purana.

Notable devotees 
This table shows the devotees of the Goddess according to the purana.

Content and Structure 
The theosophy in the text, state Foulston and Abbott, is an encyclopedic mix of ancient history, metaphysics and bhakti. This history, states C Mackenzie Brown, is of the same type found in other Puranas, about the perpetual cycle of conflict between the good and the evil, the gods and the demons. These legends build upon and extend the ancient Hindu history, such as those found in the Mahabharata. However, this Purana's legends refocus the legends around the divine feminine, integrate a devotional theme to goddesses, and the Devi is asserted in this text to be the eternal truth, the eternal source of all of universe, the eternal end of everything, the nirguna (without form) and the saguna (with form), the supreme unchanging reality (Purusha), the phenomenal changing reality (Prakriti), as well as the soul within each living being.

Stated authorship and purpose 

From Swami Vijnanananda translation:

Puranic characteristics

As a Mahapurana 
There are two Bhagavatas in Hindu puranic literature. One is Vishnu Bhagavata and other is Devi Bhagavata. There are some doubts between genuine of these two puranas, as an example in Uma Samhita of Shiva Purana Mentioned Srimad Devi Bhagavatam as fifth Mahapurana called Srimad Bhagavatam. Also in Devi Bhagavatam itself called Srimad Bhagavata Purana.

From J. L. Shastri'a translation:

As per Ashtadash Puran Darpan by Jwala Prasad, Devi Bhagavatam narrates prakriti aspect and its complied by Vyasa.

As mentioned in the Matsya Purana, the Bhagavata Purana is contain 18,000 slokas and begins with the Gayatri and glorifies the Sarasvata Kalpa. Vyasa mentions in Devi Bhagavatam that it was composed in Sarasvata Kalpa.

From Swami Vijnanananda translation:

Five characteristics 
As a Sattvic Shakta Purana the Srimad Devi Bhagavatam has five characteristics.

From Swami Vijnanananda translation:

Sholaks / Verses 
Srimad Devi Bhagavatam consists of 12 cantos with 318 chapters. Although the number of original Sanskrit shlokas is stated to be 18,000 by the Devi Bhagavata itself. The actual text, in different versions, is close.

Cantos

First Canto 

Consisting of 20 chapters, The first book (skandha) like other major Puranas, states Rocher, presents the outline, the structure of contents, and describes how in the mythical Naimisha forest, the Devi-Bhagavata Purana was first recited among the sages. It also asserts that all of Reality was initially nirguna (without form, shape or attributes; in other words, there was nothingness except Truth). However, asserts the text, this nirguna Reality was a Bhagavati (woman), and she manifested herself as three Shaktis - Sattviki (truth, creative action), Rajasi (passion, aimless action) and Tamasi (delusion, destructive action). Its also include:

 Details about the Purana
 Devi Killing Madhu and Kaitabha
Suta narrate the story of Hayagriva 
The penance of  Vyasa, and boon granted by Lord Shiva 
The story of King Sudyumna being turned into a woman and her prayers to the Goddess and  the Goddess granting her a place at Her Lotus Feet 
 Birth of Shukadeva and visit to Mithila to meet King Janaka.

SDB 01.02.03 original Sanskrit:

Fifteen chapter in 1st canto Supreme Devi reveals her true identity to god Vishnu lying on a banyan leaf. its also mentioned that half stanza which revealed by supreme goddess is the seed of Bhagavata Purana.

Second Canto 
Consisting of 12 chapters, This canto is short, and historical. It weaves in the characters well known in the Hindu epic Mahabharata, states Rocher, and introduces in the key characters that appear in remaining books of the Devi-Bhagavata Purana.Its also include:

 Birth of  Krishna Dvaipayana
 Birth of Pandavas
 On the Kurukshetra War
 Death of Parikshit

Third Canto 
Consisting of 30 chapters,This canto mentioned the Glory of Devi Bhuvaneshvari and her worship, At the Beginning of the universe Brahma, Vishnu and Shiva see Goddess reside in Manidvipa and praise her and also weaves in legends from the well known epic the Ramayana.

 Description about the secondary creation
 Trimurti going towards the heavens on the celestial car
 Fight between Yudhâjit and Vîrasena
 Details about Navaratri festival and Rama's performing the Navarâtra ceremony 
SDB 03.03.52 original Sanskrit:

SDB 03.30.35 original Sanskrit:

Fourth Canto 
Consisting of 25 chapters, this fourth canto presents more legends, including those of interaction between avatars of Hari, Krishna and Shiva, Kashyapa birth as Vasudeva,  but also introduces tantric themes and presents yoga meditation.

 The questions put by Janamejaya regarding Krishna's incarnation
 Details about Nara and Narayana
 The fight between the Risis and Prahlada
 Description about several avatars of Vishnu
 Explain about Devi's Highest Supremacy
SDB 04.02.04:05 original Sanskrit:

Fifth Canto 

Consisting of 35 chapters,  The Canto mentioned glory devi (Devi Mahatmya), Fight between Goddess Durga and Mahishasura, Killing Sumbha and Nisumbha and other demons.

 Story of Mahishasura and the origin of goddess Mahalakshmi
 The conquest of the Heavens by Shumba - Nishumbha and Birth of Devi Kaushiki

Sixth Canto 
Consisting of 31 chapters, The sixth book continue these legends, states Rocher, with half of the chapters focussed on the greatness of Goddess, how male gods are befuddled by problems, how they run to her for help, and how she solves them because she is enlightened knowledge. The text presents the feminine to whom all masculine deities are subordinate and dependent on. Its also include Indra killing of Vritra.

Seventh Canto 

Consisting of 40 chapters, The seventh canto of the Srimad Devi-Bhagavatam shifts towards more philosophy, asserting its version of the essence of the Vedas. This book contains the philosophical text called Devi Gita, or the "Song of the Goddess". The Goddess explains she is the Brahman that created the world, asserting the Advaita premise that spiritual liberation occurs when one fully comprehends the identity of one's soul and the Brahman. This knowledge, asserts the Goddess, comes from detaching self from the world and meditating on one's own soul.Chapter 28 of the seventh book contain the story of Durgamasur and his annihilation by goddess Sivaa (Parvati) in her form of Shakambhari.

Festivals and culture 
This  canto, states Rocher, also includes sections on festivals related to Devi, pilgrimage information and ways to remember her. Her relationship with Shiva and the birth of Skanda is also briefly mentioned in the 7th book. The last ten chapters (31 to 40) of the canto 7 is the famous and philosophical Devi Gita, which often circulates in the Hindu tradition as a separate text.

Eighth Canto 
Consisting of 24 chapters, The eighth book of the Devi-Bhagavata Purana incorporates one of the five requirements of Puranic-genre of Hindu texts, that is a theory of the geography of the earth, planets and stars, the motion of sun and moon, as well as explanation of time and the Hindu calendar. Its include:

 In the beginning of creation Manu (Hinduism) praise Devi and Lord taking Varaha avatar
 Divisions of Bhu Mandala with Seven islands
 Various avatars of Vishnu worship in Jambudvīpa 
 Description of the movement of the Moon and other planets.
 Narada worship and praises Lord Ananta
 Description about nether worlds and different hells

Ninth Canto 
The largest canto is the 9th skandha Consisting of 50 chapters, which is very similar in structure and content of the Prakriti-kanda of the Brahmavaivarta Purana. Both are goddesses-focused, and discuss her theology, but have one difference. The Prakriti-kanda of the Brahmavaivarta Purana also includes many verses which praise Vishnu using various names (incarnations), which re-appear in the 9th book of the Devi Bhagavata Purana with Vishnu names substituted with Devi names (incarnations). Its also Mentioned Krishna as the male form of goddess.

 Description of five forms of Devi Prakriti 
 Manifestation of Shri Krishna and Description of First creation (Sarga)
 Birth of Brahma, Vishnu and Shiva
 Lakshmi, Saraswati and Ganga (goddess), mutually curse each other and descend them on Bharatavarsha.
 Description of the period of Kali Yuga.
 Story of Devi Tulsi 
 Significance and attributes of Bhagavati Bhuvaneshvari
 Goddess Mahalakshmi manifests from ocean of Milk
 Description of mantras and songs of praise to Devi Radha and goddess Durga.

SDB 09.38.29:31 original Sanskrit:

Tenth Canto 
Consisting of 13 chapters, This Canto of the Devi-Bhagavata Purana is one of the shortest, and integrates manavantaras, another structural requirement for this text to be a major Purana, but wherein the Devi is worshiped in every cosmic time cycle, because she is the greatest, she kills the evil and she nurtures the good.Chapter 13 of the tenth book describes the glory of goddess Bhramri that how in the past she killed the demon Arunasura.

 The creation Swayambhu Manu and Description of other Manus.
 Narada describes the greatness of Vindhya who tries to stop the path of Sun God.

Eleventh Canto 
Consisting of 24 chapters, This canto of the text discusses Sadachara (virtues) and Dharma to self as an individual, as belonging to a Grama (village, community) and to a Desha (country). The text praises Sruti and asserts it to be the authoritative source, adding that Smriti and Puranas are also sources for guidance. This section is notable for adding that Tantra is also a source of guidance, but only if it does not conflict with the Vedas. Verses in the 11th books also describe sources for Rudraksha as Japa beads, the value of Tripundra mark on the forehead, five styles of Sandhyas (reflection, meditation) and five types of Yajnas.

Twelfth Canto 
The last and 12th canto of the Devi-Bhagavatam Consisting of 14 chapters, Its describes the Goddess as the mother of the Vedas, she as the Adya Shakti (primal, primordial power), and the essence of the Gayatri mantra. The verses map every syllable of the Gayatri mantra to 1008 names of reverence in the Hindu tradition. These names span a spectrum of historic sages, deities, musical meters, mudras and the glories of the goddesses. Also in Chapter 10 to Chapter 12 Describe the supreme abode of Devi called Manidvipa which is above Vaikuntha and Goloka.

SDB 12.10.03:04 original Sanskrit:

SDB 12.13.27:28 original Sanskrit

Devi Gita 
Main articles: Devi Gita

The Devi Gita, like the Bhagavad Gita, is a condensed philosophical treatise. It presents the divine female as a powerful and compassionate creator, pervader and protector of the universe. She is, states Brown, presented in the opening chapter of the Devi Gita as the benign and beautiful world-mother, called Bhuvaneshvari (literally, ruler of the universe, and the word is feminine). Thereafter, theological and philosophical teachings become the focus of the text, covering chapters 2 to 10 of the Devi Gita (or, chapters 32 to 40 of this Purana's Book 7). Some of the verses of Devi Gita are almost identical to the Devi Upanishad.

The Devi Gita frequently explains Shakta ideas by quoting from the Bhagavad Gita.  The Devi is described by the text as a "universal, cosmic energy" resident within each individual, weaving in the terminology of Samkhya school of Hindu philosophy.  It is suffused with Advaita Vedanta ideas, wherein nonduality is emphasized, all dualities are declared as incorrect, and interconnected oneness of all living being's soul with Brahman is held as the liberating knowledge. However, adds Tracy Pintchman, Devi Gita incorporates Tantric ideas giving the Devi a form and motherly character rather than the gender-neutral concept of Adi Shankara's Advaita Vedanta.

Supreme Goddess describes her gross form in Devi Gita as follows:

{{Blockquote|text=Brahma, Vishnu, Rudhra, Ishvara and Sadashiva: these are the five great disembodied spirits, who are situated at the base of my feet.|source=Devi Gita (Swami Satyānanda Saraswati), Chapter 12, Verse 10

The Bhakti theology of the Devi Gita part of this Purana may have been influenced by the Bhagavad Gita, and with Vaishnava concepts of loving devotion to Krishna found in the Bhagavata Purana. All these texts highlight different types of devotion in a Samkhya philosophy framework. Tamasic Bhakti is one, asserts the text, where the devotee prays because he is full of anger, seeks to harm others, induce pain or jealousy to others. Rajasic Bhakti is one where the devotee prays not to harm others, but to gain personal advantage, fame or wealth. Sattvic Bhakti is the type where the devotee seeks neither advantage nor harm to others but prays to purify himself, renounce any sins and surrender to the ideas embodied as Goddess to liberate himself.

SDB 07.37.11:12 original Sanskrit:

SDB 07.37.13:14 original Sanskrit:

Disciples of Swami Vijnanananda translation:

Translations 
There are several separate translations of Devi Gita.

 Devi Gita - The Song of The Goddess translated by C. Mackenzie Brown
 Devi Gita translated by swami Satyananda Saraswati
 Sri Devi Gita translated by Ramamurthy Natarajan

Philosophy

Vedic Literature 
Devi Bhagavatam mentioned number of Vedic mantras connected with observance. In eleventh canto describes certain rites, also Devi is identified with Yajurveda and Rudra. In the ninth canto mentioned various phase powers of Devi. Dhyana stotras of Lakshmi and Svaha are adopted from Samaveda. Use of Rudrakshas mentioned in ninth canto is supported by the Sruti.

Upanishad 
Devi Bhagavatam adopted some of passages in Upanishad. In seventh canto in purana Devi describe her own form these verses are identical with some verses of Devi Upanishad. Also in fourth canto some famous expressions of Taittiriya Upanishad are used to describe the nature of Devi. The four states of consciousness described in the Mandukya Upanishad, are mentioned in 30th chapter of sixth canto.

Samkhya 

Devi Bhagavatam belong to the Shaktadvaitavada tradition (syncretism of Samkhya and Advaita Vedanta. literally, the path of nondualistic Shakti). The duality of Prakriti and Purusha in Samkhya is not accepted by Devi Bhagavatam. In the text prakriti is identified with Parashakti. She is also called Mulaprakriti. The text maintains that the Gunas are of mixing nature and when they pair together they condition each other. This is an adaptation from the Samkhya theory.

Bhakti 
Main articles: Bhakti and Bhakti yoga

The Devi Bhagavata Purana adds Para Bhakti (Sanskrit: दवी) in Devi Gita as the highest level of devotion, states McDaniel, where the devotee seeks neither boon nor liberation but weeps when he remembers her because he loves the Goddess, when he feels her presence everywhere and sees the Goddess in all living beings, he is intoxicated by her ideas and presence.

From Swami Vijnanananda translation:

Reception
The verses and ideas in the Devi-Bhagavata Purana, state Foulston and Abbott, are built on the foundation of the Upanishads wherein the nonduality and oneness of Brahman and Atman (soul) are synthesized. The text makes references to the philosophy and metaphors used in the Advaita Vedanta tradition of Adi Shankara. However, those ideas are reformulated and centered around the Goddess in the Devi Bhagavata Purana, states C Mackenzie Brown, as well as other scholars. In Devi Bhagavata text, states Tracy Pintchman, the Devi is not only Brahman-Atman (soul, interconnected oneness), she is also the always-changing empirical reality (Maya).

SDB 01.18.41 original Sanskrit:

The Goddess, in Devi Bhagavata Purana, is both the source of self-bondage through Avidya (ignorance) and the source of self-liberation through Vidya (knowledge), state Foulston and Abbott. She is identical to the Vedic metaphysical reality concept of Brahman, the supreme power, the ruler of the universe, the hero, the hidden energy, the power, the bliss innate in everything, according to the text. The Devi, states Kinsley, is identified by this Purana to be all matter, mother earth, the cosmos, all of nature including the primordial. The Goddess is presented, states Brown, as "the womb of the universe", who observes the actions of her children, nurtures them to discover and realize their true nature, forgive when they make mistakes, be fearsomely terrible to the wicked that threaten her children, and be friend of all souls.

Cynthia Humes compares the depiction of Goddess in the 6th-century Hindu text Devi Mahatmya, with that in this later Devi-Bhagavata Purana text. Both revere the feminine, states Humes, but there are some important differences. Nowhere does the Devi Mahatmya state anything negative about women, and it is explicit in asserting that "all women are portions of the Goddess". By contrast, states Humes, the portrayal of women in Devi-Bhagavata Purana is more complex. It includes verses critical of the feminine, with the text stating that behavior of woman can be "reckless, foolish, cruel, deceitful" and the like. The Devi Bhagavata also praises women and describes their behavior can be "heroic, gentle, tenacious, strong" and the like.

The Devi-Bhagavata Purana is an important and historic Shakta Bhakti text, states June McDaniel.

Commentaries and translations

Commentaries 

 Studies in Devi Bhagavata - P.G. Layle
Srimad Devi Bhagavatam with the Tika of Nilakantha 
Discourses on the Devi Bhagavatam - Pt Vidur Prasad Dahal
The Triumph of the Goddess : The Canonical Models and Theological Visions of the Devi-Bhagavata Purana

Translations 
The Devi Bhagavata Purana has been translated into different languages.

Telugu 
Mulugu Papayaradhya, an 18th-century Telugu poet, is regarded as the first poet to translate the Devi Bhagavata Purana into Telugu. 
Tirupati Venkata Kavulu also translated this purana into Telugu language in 1896 entitled Devi Bhagavatamu. They have divided the purana into 6 skandas and themselves published it in 1920.
Dasu Sriramulu (1846 -1908) a scholar, composer, poet, Avadhani, orator, proficient in astrology and dramaturgy, translator, founder of a music school, nationalist and social reformer and author of kavyalu, Satakas, plays, musical and dance compositions in Telugu. He translated many satakams and plays from Sanskrit into Telugu. He translated Sri Devi Bhagavatham, which was first published in 1907.
Sri Devi Bhagavatham by Acharya Bethavolu Ramabrahmam in 2005
Sri Devi Bhagavatam translated by Smt. S Rukminamma

Kannada 
 Edatore Chandrashekhara Sastry has translated the entire Devi Bhagavatam to Kannada with Sanskrit Text. This was published in 11 volumes at Mysore. (Jayachamarajendra Grantha Ratna Mala - 5)
Sri Devi Bhagavata by Pavana Sutha

Malayalam 

 Srimad Devi Bhagavatam translated by Varavoor Shamu Menon and Dr. N. P Unni
 Shrimad Devi Bhagavata published by Aarshasri Publications Co

Hindi 

 Devi Bhagavatam published by Gita Press
Shri Mad Devi Bhagwat Mahapuran by Laxmi prakashan
Shrimad Devi Bhagavata Purana in Simple Hindi Language by Gita Press 
A Synopsis of Devi Bhagawat  by Gita Press 
Srimad Devi Bhagawat Mahapurana by Shivjeet Singh

Gujarati 

 શરીમદ દવી ભાગવત: Shrimad Devi Bhagavata Purana by Harendra Shukla

Bengali 

 Devi Bhagavatam by Navabharat Publishers, Kolkata

Nepali 

 Srimad Devi Bhagawat Mahapuran (Nepali) translated by Gaurishankar Vasistha (SRI DURGA SAHITYA BHANDAR, VARANASI)

Tamil 

 Devi Bhagavatam - Karthikeyan by Giri Trading Agency private limited 
 Sri Devi Bhagavatha 3 parts translated by  Durgadoss S.K.Swami and Prema Pirasuram
 Shrimad Devi Bhagavata Purana in Tamil (Set of 2 Volumes)  by Vidya Venkataraman
 Sri Devi Bhagavatham by Acharya Bethavolu Ramabrahmam - V.G.S Publishers

English 
 Swami Vijnanananda translated the Devi Bhagavatam to English with Sanskrit Text.
 Ramesh Menon translated condensed English version of The Devi Bhagavatam in 2010
Srimad Devibhagavata Puranam (Sanskrit Text with English Translation in Two Volumes) by Bahadur Sris Chandra

German 

 Shrīmad Devī Bhāgavatam: Mutter Natur in Aktion by  Michael Stibane

Russian 

 Девибхагавата-Пурана. В 6 томах (Devi Bhagavata Purana) - Клуб Касталия (Kastalia Club)

In Popular Culture
Colors TV launched a mythological series named Jai Jag Janani Maa Durga in 2012 based on Devi-Bhagavata Purana.
Colors TV launched a mythological series named Mahakali — Anth Hi Aarambh Hai in 2017 partially based on Devi-Bhagavata Purana
Sony Entertainment Television launched a mythological series named Vighnaharata Ganesha in 2017 which also portrayed episodes from this text.
Dangal TV launched a mythological series named Devi Adi Parashakti in 2020 which is also based on Devi-Bhagavata Purana.

See also

Devi Mahatmya
Markandeya Purana
Shiva Purana
Mahadevi

Notes

References

Bibliography

External links
 English Translation of the Devi Bhagavata by Swami Vijnanananda
 Devi Bhagavata Purana English translation correct IAST transliteration and glossary

Puranas
Shaktism
Hindu philosophy
Sanskrit texts
Religious texts